The 2009–10 Munster Rugby season was Munster's ninth season competing in the Celtic League, alongside which they also competed in the Heineken Cup. It was Tony McGahan's second season as Director of Rugby.

2009–10 squad

Pre-season

2009–10 Celtic League

Play-offs

Semi-final

2009–10 Heineken Cup

Pool 1

Quarter-final

Semi-final

References

External links
2009–10 Munster Rugby season official site 

2009–10
2009–10 Celtic League by team
2009–10 in Irish rugby union
2009–10 Heineken Cup by team